Cuiabá Arsernal is a Brazilian American football team based in Cuiabá, in Mato Grosso, founded in January 2006, affiliated to AFAB (Associação de Futebol Americano do Brasil). The team name was a tribute to the War Arsenal, a historic building in Cuiabá that today is a cultural center under the administration of the SESC. Cuiabá Arsenal was the champion of I Brazil Bowl. Matt Rahn, an Arena Football League player, is an ambassador for the team.

External links

Official websites 
Official website
Official LBFA website

Cuiabá Arsenal
American football teams established in 2006
Sports teams in Brazil
2006 establishments in Brazil
Cuiabá
Sport in Mato Grosso